Castelo Real was a Portuguese castle established in Mogador, now Essaouira in Morocco, by the Portuguese in 1506.

Construction (1506)
The Portuguese king Dom Manuel ordered Diogo de Azambuja, the founder of Castello da Mina, to build a castle on a small island, now called "La Petite Ile", in the Moroccan locality of Mogador. The role of the castle was to serve as a relay on their routes along the Moroccan coast, between Safi, where the Portuguese were established since the end of the 15th century, and Agadir, which had just been occupied in 1504. The castle could also easily receive supplies from Madeira.

The building of the fortress was strongly opposed by local Berbers. Other Portuguese captains commanded the castle: Francisco de Miranda and Dom Pedro de Azevedo. On 12 May 1510, the king named Nicolau de Sousa as perpetual commander, but the castle was soon taken over by the local Berbers, and in December 1510 the castle had to be abandoned and the garrison relocated at Safi.

The castle was then occupied sporadically by the local Berbers.

The castle appears in various subsequent documents, as late as 1767 with the map of Théodore Cornut. Soon however the fortifications of Essaouira were updated to become what they are today, and all traces of the Castelo Real have disappeared.

Destruction (18th century)

The Castelo Real was totally demolished in the 18th century, following the plans to build the Essaouira city and fortifications by Mohammed ben Abdallah. 

In its place are now 18th-century fortications, called the "Scala del Mar". Nothing remains of the Castelo Real, but judging from old maps, its location was at the end of the Scala del Mar.

Other Portuguese fortresses in Morocco
Altogether, the Portuguese are documented to have seized 6 Moroccan towns, and built 6 stand-alone fortresses on the Moroccan Atlantic coast, between the river Loukos in the north and the river of Sous in the south. Four of them only had a short duration: Graciosa (1489), São João da Mamora (1515), Castelo Real of Mogador (1506–10) and Aguz (1520–25). Two of them were to become permanent urban settlements: Santa Cruz do Cabo de Gué (Agadir, founded in 1505-06), and Mazagan founded in 1514-17. The Portuguese had to abandon most of their settlements between 1541 and 1550, although they were able to keep Ceuta, Tangier and Mazagan.

See also
 Morocco-Portugal relations

Notes

Former Portuguese colonies
Colonial history of Morocco
Forts in Morocco
Essaouira
Buildings and structures completed in 1506
1506 establishments in the Portuguese Empire
1510 disestablishments in the Portuguese Empire
Buildings and structures demolished in the 18th century
16th-century establishments in Africa
16th century in Morocco
Portuguese colonial architecture in Morocco